Ceratophyllus farreni is a species of flea native to Britain in the family Ceratophyllidae. It was described by Rothschild in 1905.

References 

Ceratophyllidae
Insects described in 1905